Matteo Borboni or Borbone (circa 1610November 13, 1689) was an Italian painter, known for fresco depiction of quadratura during the Baroque period, active mainly in his native Bologna.

Biography
Borboni began as a pupil of Gabriele Ferrantini, and later along with his lifelong friend Giovanni Andrea Sirani, a member of the studio of Giovanni Battista Cavazza. The friendship with Sirani was such that Borboni designed the catafalque for the exequeys of the painter Elisabetta Sirani that took place in San Domenico in 1665. The display was inspired by the main altar of San Petronio, that had been designed by Vignola.

Of his existing works, remains an Assumption of the Virgin located above the organ in the Basilica of Santa Maria dei Servi. He collaborated with Gioacchino Pizzoli in the decoration of the Palazzo Ducale of Mirandola and Ducal Palace of Parma. An inventory of his possessions, including drawings, paintings, and designs, was documented by the contemporary painter Paolo Antonio Paderni, and included engravings by Agostino Carracci; (a Passion after Tintoretto); Bartolomeo Coriolano (The Fall of Giants after Guido Reni); Antonio Tempesta; a portrait made of Guercino; and drawings or paintings by Ludovico Carracci; Carlo Volla; Antonio Dal Sole (il Munchini); and Benedetto Possenti.

He is described as also being active in Avignon, France at the behest of princes of Italy.

References

External links

1610 births
1689 deaths
17th-century Italian painters
Italian male painters
Painters from Bologna
Italian Baroque painters